Darlan Cunha (Rio de Janeiro, September 16, 1985) is a Brazilian actor. Better known as Laranjinha from his breakthrough role in Cidade dos Homens and from his part in the film Cidade de Deus. He began his career when he was selected for the short film Palace II, along with Douglas Silva.

Filmography
 Palace II
 Cidade de Deus (2002)
 O Natal no Sítio do Picapau Amarelo (2002) 
 Cidade dos Homens (2003)
 Meu Tio Matou Um Cara (2004)
 Cidade dos Homens – The Movie (2007)
 Sete Pecados (2007)
 Caminho das Índias (2009)
 City of God - 10 Years Later (2012)

External links
 
Darlan Cunha at Twitter
 Darlan Cunha biography

References 

1988 births
Living people
Brazilian male telenovela actors
Brazilian male film actors
Male actors from Rio de Janeiro (city)
Afro-Brazilian male actors